The 1932–33 National Football League was the 6th staging of the National Football League, a Gaelic football tournament for the Gaelic Athletic Association county teams of Ireland, held in 1932 and 1933.

Meath won the league, with captain Bill Shaw (Summerhill) scoring a last-minute point to win the final.

Format 
There were three divisions – Western, 'A', and Midland. The winners of the Western Division met the winners of Division 'A' in the semi-final, while the winners of the Midland Division proceeded to the final.

There was also a Special Division, but the winners of this did not progress to the knockout stages.

Main League

Midland Division

Results
 and  both withdrew.

Table

Division 'A'

Results

Table

Western Division
 won, ahead of Sligo, Galway, Leitrim and Roscommon.

Results

Finals

Special Division

Special Division (Eastern Section)

Special Division (Southern Section)

Final

References

National Football League
National Football League
National Football League (Ireland) seasons